The 1915 Chesterton by-election was a parliamentary by-election held for the House of Commons constituency of the Chesterton or Western Division of Cambridgeshire  on 13 February 1915.

Vacancy
The by-election was caused by the appointment of the sitting Liberal MP, the Rt. Hon. Edwin Montagu as Chancellor of the Duchy of Lancaster with a seat in the Cabinet.  Under the Parliamentary rules of the day had to resign and fight a by-election.

Candidates
Montagu was re-selected to fight the seat by his local Liberal Association and as the wartime truce between the political parties was in operation   
no opposing candidate was nominated against him.

The result
There being no other candidates putting themselves forward Montagu was returned unopposed.

References

See also
List of United Kingdom by-elections 
United Kingdom by-election records
1916 Chesterton by-election

1915 elections in the United Kingdom
1915 in England
20th century in Cambridgeshire
February 1915 events
By-elections to the Parliament of the United Kingdom in Cambridgeshire constituencies
Unopposed ministerial by-elections to the Parliament of the United Kingdom in English constituencies